The Champion Trainer of flat racing in Great Britain is the trainer whose horses have won the most prize money during a season. The list below shows the Champion Trainer for each year since 1896. The Championship was originally run from November until the end of the following October but since 2016 it has spanned from January until December.

Championship winners by trainer

Championship winners by year

 1896 - Alfred Hayhoe
 1897 - Richard Marsh
 1898 - Richard Marsh
 1899 - John Porter
 1900 - Richard Marsh
 1901 - John Huggins
 1902 - Bob Sievier
 1903 - George Blackwell
 1904 - Peter Gilpin
 1905 - Jack Robinson
 1906 - George Lambton
 1907 - Alec Taylor, Jr.
 1908 - Charles Morton
 1909 - Alec Taylor, Jr.
 1910 - Alec Taylor, Jr.
 1911 - George Lambton
 1912 - George Lambton
 1913 - Richard Wootton
 1914 - Alec Taylor, Jr.
 1915 - Charles Peck
 1916 - Dick Dawson
 1917 - Alec Taylor, Jr.
 1918 - Alec Taylor, Jr.
 1919 - Alec Taylor, Jr.
 1920 - Alec Taylor, Jr.
 1921 - Alec Taylor, Jr.
 1922 - Alec Taylor, Jr.
 1923 - Alec Taylor, Jr.
 1924 - Dick Dawson
 1925 - Alec Taylor, Jr.
 1926 - Fred Darling
 1927 - Frank Butters
 1928 - Frank Butters
 1929 - Dick Dawson
 1930 - Atty Persse
 1931 - Joseph Lawson
 1932 - Frank Butters
 1933 - Fred Darling
 1934 - Frank Butters
 1935 - Frank Butters
 1936 - Joseph Lawson
 1937 - Cecil Boyd-Rochfort
 1938 - Cecil Boyd-Rochfort
 1939 - Jack Jarvis
 1940 - Fred Darling
 1941 - Fred Darling
 1942 - Fred Darling
 1943 - Walter Nightingall
 1944 - Frank Butters
 1945 - Walter Earl
 1946 - Frank Butters
 1947 - Fred Darling
 1948 - Noel Murless
 1949 - Frank Butters
 1950 - Charles Semblat
 1951 - Jack Jarvis
 1952 - Marcus Marsh
 1953 - Jack Jarvis
 1954 - Cecil Boyd-Rochfort
 1955 - Cecil Boyd-Rochfort
 1956 - Charles Elsey
 1957 - Noel Murless
 1958 - Cecil Boyd-Rochfort
 1959 - Noel Murless
 1960 - Noel Murless
 1961 - Noel Murless
 1962 - Dick Hern
 1963 - Paddy Prendergast
 1964 - Paddy Prendergast
 1965 - Paddy Prendergast
 1966 - Vincent O'Brien
 1967 - Noel Murless
 1968 - Noel Murless
 1969 - Arthur Budgett
 1970 - Noel Murless
 1971 - Ian Balding
 1972 - Dick Hern
 1973 - Noel Murless
 1974 - Peter Walwyn
 1975 - Peter Walwyn
 1976 - Henry Cecil
 1977 - Vincent O'Brien
 1978 - Henry Cecil
 1979 - Henry Cecil
 1980 - Dick Hern
 1981 - Michael Stoute
 1982 - Henry Cecil
 1983 - Dick Hern
 1984 - Henry Cecil
 1985 - Henry Cecil
 1986 - Michael Stoute
 1987 - Henry Cecil
 1988 - Henry Cecil
 1989 - Michael Stoute
 1990 - Henry Cecil
 1991 - Paul Cole
 1992 - Richard Hannon Sr.
 1993 - Henry Cecil
 1994 - Michael Stoute
 1995 - John Dunlop
 1996 - Saeed bin Suroor
 1997 - Michael Stoute
 1998 - Saeed bin Suroor
 1999 - Saeed bin Suroor
 2000 - Sir Michael Stoute
 2001 - Aidan O'Brien
 2002 - Aidan O'Brien
 2003 - Sir Michael Stoute
 2004 - Saeed bin Suroor
 2005 - Sir Michael Stoute
 2006 - Sir Michael Stoute
 2007 - Aidan O'Brien
 2008 - Aidan O'Brien
 2009 - Sir Michael Stoute
 2010 - Richard Hannon Sr.
 2011 - Richard Hannon Sr.
 2012 - John Gosden
 2013 - Richard Hannon Sr.
 2014 - Richard Hannon Jr.
 2015 - John Gosden
 2016 - Aidan O'Brien
 2017 - Aidan O'Brien
 2018 - John Gosden
 2019 - John Gosden
 2020 - John Gosden
 2021 - Charlie Appleby

Records
Most titles - 12, Alec Taylor, Jr.
Most consecutive titles - 7, Alec Taylor, Jr. (1917-1923)
Father/Son Winners - Richard March (1897, 1998 & 1900) and Marcus March (1952)   Richard Hannon Sr (1992, 2010, 2011 & 2013) and Richard Hannon Jr (2014)
Longest time between first and last win - Sir Michael Stoute 28 years (1981-2009)
Nationality - Irish based trainers have won the championship 3 times Paddy Prendergast (1963-65), Vincent O'Brien (1966 & 1977) and Aidan O'Brien (2001, 2002, 2007, 2008, 2016 & 2017) while French based Charles Semblat won the championship in 1950. In 1901 American trainer John Huggins was the first trainer from outside England to win the championship.  Championship winner Cecil Boyd-Rochfort who trained out of Newmarket was Irish born while Frank Butters who was also Newmarket based was born in Vienna, Austria. Saeed bin Suroor is of Emirati nationality having been born in Dubai, United Arab Emirates.  1913 Champion trainer Richard Wootton who was born in Australia trained horses in Australia, the UK, and South Africa. Walter Earl was born in Bohemia in the present-day Czech Republic. Ian Balding the 1971 winner was born in the US, but his family returned to the UK in 1945.

See also
 British flat racing Champion Jockey
 British flat racing Champion Apprentice
 British flat racing Champion Owner
 British jump racing Champion Trainer
 British jump racing Champion Jockey
 Leading sire in Great Britain & Ireland

References

Racehorse training awards
Horse racing in Great Britain